Azkajwar-Abdallah was the Afrighid king of Khwarazm from the late 8th till the early 9th century. The precise date of his regnal period is uncertain. He ascended as king after 762, but not later than 783 or 787. He was the grandson of his predecessor Sawashfan. Azkajwar-Abdallah is notable for converting to Islam, taking the Muslim name of Abdallah. He was also the last Afrighid king to have coins minted in pre-Islamic style. The latest discovered coin of Azkajwar-Abdallah cites his overlord the Tahirid dynast Tahir ibn Husayn, who governed Khurasan on behalf of the Abbasid Caliphate in 821–822. Azkajwar-Abdallah was succeeded by Mansur.

References

Sources
 
 

820s deaths
8th-century births
9th-century Iranian people
8th-century Iranian people
Afrighids
Zoroastrian rulers
Converts to Islam from Zoroastrianism